Palli Karma Sahayak Foundation or PKSF is a financial institution founded by the Government of Bangladesh to finance rural development and provide training and is located in Dhaka, Bangladesh. Dr Qazi Kholiquzzaman Ahmad is the Chairman of Palli Karma Sahayak Foundation. It offers financial and non-financial services to the rural people in Bangladesh.

History
Palli Karma Sahayak Foundation was established on 1990 by the government of Bangladesh. The organization provides finances to Non-governmental organization that provide credit and non-financial services at the grassroots.

The Foundation received Nawab Ali Chowdhury National Award in 2012 for poverty alleviation. The foundation as of 2020 assists about 12 million households with financial and non-financial services. It is the largest agency for rural development in Bangladesh.

References

1990 establishments in Bangladesh
Finance in Bangladesh
Organisations based in Dhaka
Rural development in Bangladesh